Club Social y Deportivo Estudiantes de Medicina is a Peruvian football club from the city of Ica.

The club were founded 1975 and play in the Copa Perú which is the third division of the Peruvian league.

History
The club was 2000 Copa Perú champion, when defeated Coronel Bolognesi in the finals.

The club have played at the highest level of Peruvian football on three occasions, in the 2001, 2002, and 2003 Torneo Descentralizado.

In the 2004 Torneo Descentralizado, the club fused with the Atlético Grau, forming the club Grau-Estudiantes but was relegated the same year.

Notable players

Honours

National
Torneo Clausura: 0
Runner-up (1): 2001

Copa Perú: 1
Winners (1): 2000

Regional
Región IV: 2
Winners (2): 1999, 2000
Runner-up (1): 1998

Liga Departamental de Ica: 6
Winners (6): 1995, 1996, 1997, 1998, 1999, 2000

See also
List of football clubs in Peru
Peruvian football league system

Football clubs in Peru
Association football clubs established in 1975
University and college association football clubs